is a Japanese sports shooter from Kanuma. Her father was also a sports shooter. She competed in the women's skeet event at the 2016 Summer Olympics.

References

External links
 

1974 births
Living people
Japanese female sport shooters
Olympic shooters of Japan
Shooters at the 2016 Summer Olympics
Sportspeople from Tochigi Prefecture
Shooters at the 2014 Asian Games
Shooters at the 2018 Asian Games
Asian Games competitors for Japan
Shooters at the 2020 Summer Olympics
20th-century Japanese women
21st-century Japanese women